The Hawk class were a minesweeper class of the United States Navy during World War II.

All three vessels were originally fishing trawlers acquired by requisition purchase from the General Sea Foods Corp. of Boston. They patrolled off the New England coast from 1942, until they were decommissioned in 1944.

Ships

References 

Mine warfare vessel classes